What Leave Behind is a 2004 studio album by Oakland, California-based experimental music group Toychestra and English experimental guitarist Fred Frith. It was recorded in May 2003 and January 2004, and was released in 2004 on the French label, S.K. Records. It is a concerto for electric guitar and toy orchestra composed by Dan Plonsey for Toychestra and Frith to perform.

Background
Composer and saxophonist Dan Plonsey from the San Francisco Bay Area Improv Scene first got to know Toychestra in 1998 when he booked them at his Beanbender's music venue in Berkeley, California. He was intrigued by their performance, and decided to team them up with fellow Bay Area Improv Scene member and experimental guitarist, Fred Frith. Plonsey wrote a concerto for electric guitar and toy orchestra for Toychestra and Frith to perform. The concerto turned out to be a challenge for Plonsey because most of the members of Toychestra could not read sheet music. He said that he "started out writing some simple, repeating bits to play. I wanted to see what would happen, because they'd never worked with written music before. It was all totally aural." Plonsey was impressed with the result.

Reception

Casey Rae-Hunter of Dusted Magazine said that the collaboration of Toychestra and Fred Frith on What Leave Behind is "hilarious, stunning, intense, and highly listenable", and described the music as "polyphonic bedtime music for the half-forgotten child within". Joshua Glazer of AllMusic had reservations about this Frith / Toychestra liaison, but was surprised at the result, saying that it was "far more palatable than one would initially expect." Glazer described the concerto as "an experimental piece that never gazes too intently at its own weirdness or technique."

Track listing

Personnel
Fred Frith – electric guitar
Toychestra
Michelle Adams – sterling beat, finger chimes, concertmate 500, melodica, recorder, vocals
Angela Coon – melodica, toy bugle, genie diary "girlz rock", vocals
Petra Podlahová – accordion people, concertmate 500, slat drum, sterling beat
Shari Robertson – zither, violin, melodica, vocals
Lexa Walsh – accordion people, xylo-piano, silly sentences, vocals
Corey Weinstein – melodica, pink zoo train, tube xylophone, train whistle, vocals

Production and artwork
Recorded at Guerrilla Recording in May 2003 and January 2004
Mixed by Dan Plonsey, Fred Frith, Myles Boisen, Lexa Walsh
Produced by Dan Plonsey, Toychestra, Fred Frith and Myles Boisen
Mastered by Myles Boisen
Photography by Gary Nakamoto
Graphic design by Lexa Walsh

References

External links

2004 debut albums
Experimental music albums
Fred Frith albums
Albums produced by Fred Frith
Collaborative albums
Guitar concertos